Ernest Cary Brace (August 15, 1931 – December 5, 2014) was the longest-held civilian prisoner of war (POW) during the Vietnam War. A decorated Marine Corps fighter pilot and mustang, Brace was court-martialed in 1961 for attempting to fake his own death. He flew as a civilian contract pilot before being captured in Laos in 1965 while flying supplies for USAID.  He spent almost eight years as a POW and upon his release received a Presidential pardon in light of his good conduct.

Military career
Brace was born in Detroit, Michigan in 1931. He enlisted in the Marine Corps in 1947 at age 15 as an aviation radar and radio technician.  He earned his Pilot's Wings and his commission as a Second Lieutenant from the Aviation Cadet School, graduating in August 1951.  During his tour in the Korean War (from April 1952 to March 1953), he flew more than 100 missions. While assigned to Marine Attack Squadron 121 in November 1952, Second Lieutenant Brace participated in a dive-bombing attack against a Korean hydroelectric plant.  Brace received surface-to-air fire as he took low-altitude reconnaissance imagery of the bombing results.  He was able to fly his damaged AD-3 Skyraider clear of the Korean Peninsula, crashing in the Sea of Japan where he was rescued by USS Kidd.  For his courage and initiative, Brace was awarded the Distinguished Flying Cross.

Years later, Brace (then a captain) crashed his T-28 Trojan into a cornfield near the mouth of the Choptank River near Cambridge, Maryland during a training flight on 3 January 1961.  He fled the scene but turned himself in ten days later once his empty flight-suit was found hidden in vegetation.  Brace faced a court-martial and was charged with deliberately crashing his aircraft and faking his death so that his wife Patricia could collect insurance money to pay off debts.  Brace pleaded guilty to unauthorized absence and was acquitted of the deliberate destruction of his aircraft.  The court-martial ended his military career.

Capture

Brace then worked as a civilian pilot for a number of companies before flying for BirdAir, an airline contracted by the Thai Border Patrol Police.  BirdAir also supported USAID interests in Southeast Asia.  On 21 May 1965, he flew Royal Thai Army Sergeant Chaicharn, as well as other passengers and cargo to a dirt airstrip in the Northern Laotian village of Baum Lao in Muong Houn District.  Brace's aircraft, a Pilatus PC-6 Porter, received small arms fire upon landing, rendering it incapable of taking off again.  Both he and Chaicharn were immediately taken prisoner (either by the Vietnam People's Army or the Pathet Lao) and force-marched into the jungle from Boum Lao to Muong Hoc to Doi Sai, near Dien Bien Phu.  Brace was held in a bamboo cage with his limbs and neck bound to prevent escape.  During his captivity he was beaten, interrogated, and faced with a mock execution. He escaped 6 June 1965 for a few days before being caught stealing food from a village. Upon his return to the cage his legs were put in stocks and bolted. He escaped on 17 April 1966, and was recaptured in minutes. Buried up to his chin for seven days, Brace hit his low point and attempted to hang himself on 10 December 1967. He was sent in October 1968 to a POW camp on the outskirts of Hanoi nicknamed The Plantation, where he met John McCain in the cell next to him. Brace re-tells his story in Season 8 of Locked Up Abroad.  Like Jim Bedinger, he was sequestered from other prisoners because he had been captured in Laos.  Before Doug Hegdahl's early release from the captivity, Brace contacted Hegdahl to ensure the outside world knew about the prisoners captured in Laos.

Post-release

Brace was released on March 28, 1973, spending 7 years, 10 months and 7 days in captivity, making him the longest-held civilian POW in Vietnam.  Brace had not been listed as a prisoner during the past 7 years.  His wife Patricia assumed her husband was dead and she remarried; a fact Brace found out at the processing station after his release.  While receiving out-patient care in Naval Medical Center San Diego, Brace met a nurse named Nancy stationed there.  He married her and moved to her hometown of Klamath Falls, Oregon where he later resided.  In light of Brace's time as a POW, President Gerald Ford issued him a full pardon as well as an honorable discharge from the Marine Corps. Brace, captured as a civilian, was nominated for the Prisoner of War Medal and the Purple Heart by Admiral James Stockdale, the senior officer among US prisoners held during the Vietnam War. Because Department of Defense regulations prohibit civilians from receiving military awards, the nominations were denied four times. The most recent application in 2011, sent to the office of United States Secretary of the Navy Ray Mabus through fellow former POW John McCain, was successful. Brace commented that "these medals are the ones no one wants to get" as personal suffering is involved in qualifying for them.

Brace worked for a few years in the late 1970s as a manager for Evergreen International Aviation, supporting aviation contracts for the United Nations in South Vietnam, Africa, and Mexico.  He went on to work as an operations lead for Sikorsky Aircraft with other overseas contracts. In 2014, Klamath Community College awarded Brace an honorary associate degree in Aviation Science. The college is also considering naming their new veterans' center in his name. He died on December 5, 2014 of a pulmonary embolism. He was cremated and his ashes were scattered over his favorite fishing spot.

See also
Floyd James Thompson, the longest held POW in United States history, spending nearly nine years in captivity in Vietnam.
Everett Alvarez Jr. the second longest-held POW in United States history, spending 8.5 years in captivity in Vietnam.
List of people pardoned or granted clemency by the president of the United States

Autobiographies

References

External links
Bio at pownetwork.org
Prisoner of war

1931 births
2014 deaths
United States Marine Corps personnel of the Korean War
Shot-down aviators
Vietnam War prisoners of war
United States Marine Corps personnel who were court-martialed
Recipients of American presidential pardons
Military personnel from Detroit
Aviators from Michigan
Recipients of the Distinguished Flying Cross (United States)
Recipients of the Air Medal